Koa-á books is a form of vernacular literature of Hokkien language written in Chinese characters, and it is popular in the Taiwanese and Chinese societies where Hoklo people live. Written Hokkien in hàn-jī system are deeply influenced by koa-á characters.

Taiwanese literature
Hokkien literature